Welshfield (also Troy, Troy Center, Troy Centre, or Wellsfield) is an unincorporated community in central Troy Township, Geauga County, Ohio, United States.

History
Welshfield was named for Jacob Welsh, a pioneer settler. Jacob Welsh helped build a local church and school in exchange for the naming rights. The community once had a post office that was established on 23 February 1838.  When it was discontinued on 30 December 1958, the Burton office began to handle mail for Welshfield addresses.

Geography
Its elevation is 1,234 feet (376 m).

References

Unincorporated communities in Geauga County, Ohio
Unincorporated communities in Ohio